Fredrik Pacius (born Friedrich Pacius; 19 March 1809 – 8 January 1891) was a German-Finnish composer and conductor who lived most of his life in Finland. He has been called the "Father of Finnish music".

Pacius was born in Hamburg. He was appointed music teacher at the University of Helsinki in 1834. In Helsinki he founded a musical society, the student choir Akademiska Sångföreningen and an orchestra. In 1848, Pacius wrote the music to the poem "Vårt land" by Johan Ludvig Runeberg, which was to become Finland's national anthem. Pacius's music was also used for the Estonian national anthem "Mu isamaa, mu õnn ja rõõm" and the Livonian ethnic anthem "Min izāmō, min sindimō".

In 1852, he composed Kung Karls jakt (The Hunt of King Charles), which was the first Finnish opera, with a libretto in the style of Romantic nationalism, like the national anthem designed to convince Finland's grand duke (i.e. the Russian Emperor Nicholas I) of the total loyalty of his subjects in Finland. The libretto was written by the author and historian Zacharias Topelius in close collaboration with the composer.

His compositions also include a violin concerto, a symphony, a string quartet and several other operas.

Pacius died in Helsinki, aged 81.

Works 
 Orchestral
 Symphony in D minor (1850)
 Overture in E-flat major (1826)
 Violin Concerto in F-sharp minor (1845)
 Vocal music
 Kung Karls jakt (Kaarle-kuninkaan metsästys, "King Carl's Hunt"), opera (1852)
 Prinsessan av Cypern, Singspiel (1860)
 Die Loreley, opera (1862–87)
 Cantatas
 Choruses
 Lieder
 Chamber music
 String Quartet in E-flat major (1826)

Literature 
Tomi Mäkelä, Friedrich Pacius – ein deutscher Komponist in Finnland: mit einer Edition der Tagebücher, Briefe und Arbeitsmaterialien von Silke Bruns, Hildesheim; Zürich [etc.]: Olms; Helsinki: Svenska Litteratursällskapet i Finland, 2014, 
Tomi Mäkelä, Fredrik Pacius, kompositör i Finland, Svenska Litteratursällskapet i Finland, Helsinki 2009; 
Tomi Mäkelä, Der Pionier. Fredrik Pacius, Opernwelt, 11, 2009, 36–44.

References

External links

Finnish Music Information Center page on Pacius' Vocal Works
 

1809 births
1891 deaths
Musicians from Hamburg
Finnish classical composers
German emigrants to Finland
Male opera composers
National anthem writers
19th-century classical composers
Burials at Hietaniemi Cemetery
19th-century male musicians
Academic staff of the University of Helsinki
Finnish opera composers